Bishop Leandro Arrúe Agudo, O.A.R., was the second Bishop of Jaro. He was born in Calatayud, Zaragoza, Spain, on 13 January 1837. He took vows as a professed religious in 1856, in Monteagudo, Navarre, as Fray Leandro Arrué de San Nicolás de Tolentino, in 1865.

Ministry in the Philippines 

Fray Leandro Arrué started his missionary work in the Philippines in July 1860 when he came to Manila. On 22 September 1860, he was ordained a priest of the Augustinian Recollect Order. After his ordination, he was sent to Cagayan de Oro to study the Cebuano language in 1861, and was sent to be the parish priest of  Bacong in Negros Island in 1864.

While in Bacong, Fray Leandro built the parish rectory. He also started the construction of the stone church in 1866. From Bacong, he temporarily administered the former town of Sum-ag for some months in 1868, after which, he was appointed parish priest of Liloan, Cebu, in September of that year. He stayed in Liloan until May 1873. His subsequent responsibilities included being procurator general of his order in Manila, and prior of the Immaculate Conception Convent in Cebu.

In 1879, Fray Arrué was also elected to a three-year term as prior provincial of the Augustinian Recollects in the Philippines. Having been much sought after by the people of Bacong, he returned to Negros after serving as the head of the Philippine province of his order. He was able to finish the parish church of Bacong within his second term as curate of the town. The first Mass was celebrated there on 28 August 1883, the Feast of St. Augustine, Bacong's patron saint.

Ministry as Bishop of Jaro 

The friar distinguished himself in the work for pastoral care in the Philippines. He was zealous in his ecclesiastical ministry. Pope Leo XIII recognized these qualities of Fray Leandro, when the he appointed him Bishop of Jaro, on 27 March 1885. On 30 August of that year, he was consecrated by Pedro Payo y Piñeiro, O.P., Archbishop of Manila, as principal consecrator. The two principal co-consecrators were Mariano Cuartero y Sierra, O.A.R., Bishop of Nueva Segovia; and Bernabé García Cezón, O.P., Titular Bishop of Byblus and Vicar Apostolic of Central Tonking and Vietnam.

This Recollect bishop visited the faithful and clergy of his jurisdiction which, in those days, covered extensives territories comprising the islands of Panay, (now composed of the provinces of Iloilo, Capiz, Antique and Aklan), Guimaras, Negros (now the twin provinces of Negros Occidental and Negros Oriental), Romblon and Palawan, as well as the provinces of Cotabato, Zamboanga, Davao and Sulu in Mindanao. Known for his generosity, unblemished character and great managerial skills, Bishop Arrué took special care of the spiritual and temporal needs of the people of his diocese. He preached in all the churches of his diocese, and also constructed a hospital for the ailing and the destitute.

Bishop Leandro Arrué died 24 October 1897. His remains were buried in the Cathedral Church of St. Elizabeth of Hungary, which is now popularly known as the Jaro Cathedral.

References 

1837 births
1897 deaths
19th-century Roman Catholic bishops in the Philippines
19th-century Spanish Roman Catholic priests
Roman Catholic bishops of Jaro